Richard Dreyer (born 24 November 1960) is a former English cricketer.  Dreyer was a right-handed batsman who bowled both right-arm medium and right-arm off break.  He was born in Morpeth, Northumberland.

Dreyer made his debut for Northumberland in the 1984 Minor Counties Championship against Lincolnshire.  Dreyer played Minor counties cricket for Northumberland from 1984 to 1989, which included 22 Minor Counties Championship appearances and 3 MCCA Knockout Trophy matches.  He made his List A debut against Essex in the 1986 NatWest Trophy.  Batting, he reached 26 runs before being run out.  He made a further List A appearance, again against Essex, in the 1987 NatWest Trophy.  He scored 12 runs in this match, before being dismissed by Don Topley.

References

External links
Richard Dreyer at ESPNcricinfo
Richard Dreyer at CricketArchive

1960 births
Living people
People from Morpeth, Northumberland
Cricketers from Northumberland
English cricketers
Northumberland cricketers